Daughter of the Wilds is a 1917 British silent drama film directed by Frank Wilson and starring Chrissie White.

References

Bibliography
Connelly, Robert. Motion Picture Guide Silent Film 1910-1936. Cinebooks, 1988.

External links

1917 films
1917 drama films
British drama films
British silent feature films
Films directed by Frank Wilson
British black-and-white films
1910s English-language films
1910s British films
Silent drama films